Brandis is a town in the Leipzig district, in Saxony, Germany. It is situated 16 km east of Leipzig.

Born in Brandis 
 Karl Bock (1922-2004), physician in the field of pediatric cardiology
 Anneliese Zänsler (born 1927), opera and operetta singer, vocal pedagogue and musicologist
 Andreas Reuter (born 1949), computer scientist
 Stefan Altner (born 1956), musicologist

References 

Leipzig (district)